Genesis is the debut album by American trumpeter Charles Sullivan recorded in 1974 and released on the Strata-East label.

Reception
The Allmusic review by Michael G. Nastos awarded the album 5 stating "it's well deserving of this accolade as one of the very best post-bop efforts of its decade". The Rolling Stone Jazz Record Guide said "Every track is a winner with Charles Sullivan proving himself an outstanding composer and small-group arranger".

Track listing
All compositions by Charles Sullivan
 "Evening Song" - 8:22
 "Good-Bye Sweet John (In Memory of John Foster: Pianist)" - 5:50
 "Field Holler" - 3:51
 "Now I'll Sleep" - 4:32
 "Genesis" - 17:27

Personnel
Charles Sullivan - trumpet
Sonny Fortune - alto saxophone
Stanley Cowell, Onaje Allan Gumbs - piano
Sharon Freeman - electric piano
Alex Blake - bass
Billy Hart - drums
Lawrence Killian - congas, percussion
Dee Dee Bridgewater - vocals

References

Strata-East Records albums
Charles Sullivan (musician) albums
1974 debut albums